Soe Hok Gie (17 December 1942 – 16 December 1969) was a Chinese Indonesian activist who opposed the successive dictatorships of Presidents Sukarno and Suharto.

Overview 

Soe was an ethnic Chinese Roman Catholic, the fourth of five children in his family. His father Soe Lie Piet was a literary writer and magazine editor, and his elder brother Arief Budiman was a sociologist and lecturer at Satya Wacana Christian University and a vocal critical voice in Indonesian politics.

After spending his final years of senior high school at Kanisius, Soe attended the University of Indonesia (UI) from 1962 until 1969; upon finishing university he became a lecturer at his alma mater until his death. It was during his time as a student that Soe became an active dissident, protesting against President Sukarno and the PKI. Soe was a productive writer, with articles published in such newspapers as Kompas, Harian Kami, Sinar Harapan, Mahasiswa Indonesia, and Indonesia Raya.  After the release of Riri Riza's Gie in 2005, his articles were compiled by Stanley and Aris Santoso and republished with the title Zaman Peralihan (Transition Era) by publisher GagasMedia.

An avid proponent of living close to nature, Soe quoted Walt Whitman in his diary: "Now I see the secret of the making of the best person.  It is to grow in the open air and to eat and sleep with the earth". In 1965, Soe helped found Mapala UI, a student environmentalist organisation. He enjoyed hiking, and indeed died through inhaling poisonous gas while hiking up the volcanic Mount Semeru on the day before his 27th birthday. He was laid to rest in what is now the Museum of the Park of Memorial Stones in Central Jakarta.

Fittingly, Soe once wrote in his diary:
"Seorang filsuf Yunani pernah menulis ... nasib terbaik adalah tidak dilahirkan, yang kedua dilahirkan tapi mati muda, dan yang tersial adalah umur tua. Rasa-rasanya memang begitu. Bahagialah mereka yang mati muda."
This roughly translates to English as "A Greek philosopher once wrote ... The best fate is to never have been born, second is to be born but die young, and the most unfortunate of all is to [reach] old age. This feels pretty right: Happy are those who die young." Soe attributed the statement, which echoes similar comments from Friedrich Nietzsche, to an anonymous Greek philosopher.

His diary was published in 1983, under the title Catatan Seorang Demonstran (English: Annotations of a Demonstrator). Soe's university thesis was also published, as Di Bawah Lantera Merah (Under the Red Lantern).

Soe's diary served as the inspiration for a 2005 film, Gie, which was directed by Riri Riza and starred Nicholas Saputra as Soe Hok Gie. Soe is also the subject of a 1997 book, written by Dr. John Maxwell and entitled Soe Hok-Gie: Diary of a Young Indonesian Intellectual.  The book was translated into Indonesian in 2001, and re-titled Soe Hok-Gie: Pergulatan Intelektual Muda Melawan Tirani (which roughly translates to English as Soe Hok-Gie: A Young Intellectual's Struggle Against Tyranny).

See also 
Gie, a 2005 film based on his life
List of Chinese Indonesians

Notes

Bibliography

References 

 Translated from

External links 
 Mapala UI

1942 births
1969 deaths
Indonesian people of Chinese descent
Indonesian Hokkien people
Indonesian Roman Catholics
University of Indonesia alumni
Indonesian journalists
Academic staff of the University of Indonesia
Indonesian activists
People from Jakarta
20th-century journalists